"Aus der Tiefen rufe ich, Herr, zu dir. Herr, höre meine Stimme ..." is a German translation of the opening words of Psalm 130 ("Out of the depths have I cried unto thee, O Lord. Lord, hear my voice, ..."). (n) may also refer to:

Music 
 Aus der Tiefe, SWV 25, one of the Psalmen Davids by Heinrich Schütz, 1619
 "Aus der Tiefen rufe ich, Herr, zu dir, erhöre mich ...", German hymn by Georg Christoph Schwämmlein, 1676
 Aus der Tiefe, Geistliches Konzert by Johann Philipp Förtsch, c1700
 Aus der Tiefen rufe ich, Herr, zu dir, BWV 131, early cantata by Johann Sebastian Bach, c. 1707
 Aus der Tiefen rufen wir, GWV 1113/23a, cantata for the 2nd Sunday after Epiphany in 1723, Leipzig presentation piece by Christoph Graupner
 Aus der Tiefen rufe ich Herr höre meine Stimme, H. 419, cantata for Rogate by Gottfried Heinrich Stölzel, 1744
 Aus der Tiefe ruf' ich, Herr , cantata by Carl Friedrich Rungenhagen
 Aus der Tiefe rufe ich (Kiel), one of the Six Motets, Op. 82, by the 19th-century composer Friedrich Kiel
 Aus der Tiefe ruf' ich, Herr, zu dir, one of the Tübinger Psalmen by Max Drischner, 1948
 Aus der Tiefe rufe ich, Herr, zu dir by Volker Bräutigam, 1970
 Aus der Tiefe... for cello and organ by Zsigmond Szathmáry, 2019

Literature 
 Aus der Tiefe, poetry collection by Ada Christen, 1878
 Aus der Tiefe rufe ich, book by Cläre Jung, 1946